Saman (or the dance of a thousand hands) is one of the most popular dances in Indonesia. Its origin is from the Gayo ethnic group from Gayo Lues, Aceh province, Indonesia, and is normally performed to celebrate important occasions. The dance is characterized by its fast-paced rhythm and common harmony between dancers. These two elements are key figures of Saman, and are among the reasons Saman are widely known and practiced in Indonesia, besides being relatively easy to learn.

On November 24, 2011, UNESCO officially recognized Aceh's traditional Saman dance as an Intangible Cultural Heritage in Need of Urgent Safeguarding.

The ASEAN Tourism Association (ASEANTA) named the Saman dance as the best ASEAN cultural preservation effort at the 25th ASEANTA Awards for Excellence 2012.

Etymology
The word "saman" comes from Sheikh Saman, a cleric from Gayo in Aceh. Syekh Saman developed a dance which is now called the Saman dance to spread Islam in the land of Gayo, Province of Aceh, Indonesia.

Form

The dance is done by a group of people without musical instruments. Originally, the group was exclusively men. In performing this dance, the player sings some songs while doing some attractive movements. A short song (which leads to a short dance) can last for approximately 15 to 20 minutes.

Performance
A typical Saman performance is usually constituted of the following elements: The dancers enter the stage and immediately form a single line while sitting in a form equivalent to the Japanese seiza. The singer then begins to sing, with the lyrics at the beginning commonly telling the general attributes of Gayo culture at medium pace. The dancers then begin to move their hands in a rhythmic manner, following the movements. As the dance progresses, the movements are also performed with arms, head, and the upper body. The pace becomes faster, and the seat positions may change. The key element is that every dancer must move at the same time, creating a homogeneous, continuous, line of movement that is often described as the defining feature of Saman dance. One thing that makes this dance quite unique is that the original Saman dance which comes from Gayo Lues is not accompanied by any musical instruments.

See also

 Ratoh duek
 Likok Pulo
 Dance of Indonesia
 Islam in Indonesia

References

External links
 Saman Dance
 Shaman Dance by Indonesia Students' Group in University of Malaya
 Berjuang.my.id

Acehnese dance
Indonesian culture
Intangible Cultural Heritage in Need of Urgent Safeguarding
Masterpieces of the Oral and Intangible Heritage of Humanity
Indonesian words and phrases
Dances of Indonesia